"Superlove" is a song by Lenny Kravitz from his 2011 album Black and White America, which was remixed by Avicii. The track was released on May 29, 2012 as a digital download in the United Kingdom and charted in the UK, Belgium, Hungary and the Netherlands. Lenny has released a music video for this song to YouTube on August 27.

Track listing

Charts

Release history

References

2012 singles
Avicii songs
Lenny Kravitz songs
2011 songs
Roadrunner Records singles
Songs written by Lenny Kravitz
Songs written by Craig Ross